Richwoods Township is an inactive township in Miller County, in the U.S. state of Missouri.

Richwoods Township was named for the forest and fertile soil within its borders.

References

Townships in Missouri
Townships in Miller County, Missouri